Winslow–Lindbergh Regional Airport  is  mile west of Winslow, in Navajo County, Arizona. The U.S. Forest Service has a firefighting air tanker base here. The airport was served by TWA and Frontier Airlines but now sees no airline service.

History 
The airport was built in 1929 by Transcontinental Air Transport (TAT). Aviator Charles Lindbergh, who served as head of TAT's Technical Committee, chose Winslow as one of twelve critical refueling stops on the nation's first transcontinental passenger line. For many years it was the only all-weather airport between Albuquerque, New Mexico, and Los Angeles, California. In 1930 TAT merged with Western Air Express and the new carrier became Trans Continental and Western Air, or TWA. Ford Trimotor aircraft were first used followed by the Douglas DC-2 in 1934 and the Douglas DC-3 in 1937. During World War II the airfield was used by the United States Army Air Forces Air Transport Command as a refueling and repair stop for military aircraft. The airport is dedicated to the memory of Melvin L. Kislingbury, a Winslow resident who was killed in a WW II flight mission in Louisiana in 1943. TWA's service to Winslow ended in 1953 when the airline retired its DC-3's and acquired much larger Lockheed Constellation aircraft which were capable of flying from Los Angeles to Albuquerque without refueling.

Arizona Airways also served the city in the late 1940s and merged to become Frontier Airlines (1950–1986) in 1950. Frontier served Winslow as one of many stops along a Denver to Phoenix route as well as an Albuquerque to Phoenix route using Douglas DC-3 and later upgrading to Convair 340 and Convair 580 aircraft. Frontier's service ended in 1974 and the airport was then served by several commuter airlines with flights to Phoenix and Albuquerque. These included Cochise Airlines from 1974 through 1982, Desert Airlines in 1979 and 1980, Desert Pacific Airlines in 1980 and 1981 (direct service to Los Angeles), Sun West Airlines from 1982 through 1985, and Golden Pacific Airlines from 1985 through 1987. Lindbergh Regional Airport has not seen airline service since 1987.

Facilities

It has two asphalt runways:
 4/22 is 7,499 by 150 feet (2,286 x 46 m).
 11/29 is 7,100 by 150 feet (2,164 x 46 m).

In the year ending April 18, 2009 the airport had 19,250 aircraft operations, an average of 52 per day: 99% general aviation and 1% military. 11 aircraft were then based at this airport: 64% single-engine, 27% multi-engine and 9% helicopter.

Winslow Airport is served by Wiseman Aviation as a FBO, and is regularly visited by Cooper Aerial, an aerial photography firm.

References

Further reading
 Manning, Thomas A. (2005), History of Air Education and Training Command, 1942–2002. Office of History and Research, Headquarters, AETC, Randolph AFB, Texas  
 Shaw, Frederick J. (2004), Locating Air Force Base Sites, History’s Legacy, Air Force History and Museums Program, United States Air Force, Washington DC.

External links 

 Winslow~Lindberg Regional Airport (INW) at Arizona DOT airport directory
 

Airports in Navajo County, Arizona
Airfields of the United States Army Air Forces Air Transport Command in North America
World War II airfields in the United States
Airfields of the United States Army Air Forces in Arizona
Former Essential Air Service airports
Winslow, Arizona